Nancy G. Isenberg is an American historian, and T. Harry Williams Professor of history at Louisiana State University.

Life 
She graduated from  Rutgers University, and University of Wisconsin. Isenberg is jewish.

Awards

 1999, Society for Historians of the Early American Republic (SHEAR) book prize for Sex and Citizenship in Antebellum America
 2003, First Union International Fellowship, International Center for Jefferson Studies
 2003-2004 and 2007–2008, Kate B. and Hall J. Peterson Fellowship, American Antiquarian Society
 2008, Award for best non-fiction book for Fallen Founder, Oklahoma Center for the Book
 2008, Finalist for the Los Angeles Times Book Prize in Biography
 2016, shared with Lyra Monteiro, Walter & Lillian Lowenfels Criticism Award, Before Columbus Foundation
 2016, #4 on Politico Magazine's Annual List of the “50 Most important Thinkers”
 2017, LSU Distinguished Research Master Award
 2017, Finalist for the J. Anthony Lukas Book Prize, Columbia School of Journalism and Nieman Foundation at Harvard University
 2017, PEN Oakland Josephine Miles Award for White Trash

Works

References

External links 

Living people
Year of birth missing (living people)
21st-century American historians
Historians of the United States
Rutgers University alumni
University of Wisconsin–Madison alumni
University of Tulsa faculty
Louisiana State University faculty
American Book Award winners